Metopimazine, sold under the brand names Nortrip, Vogalen, and Vogalene, is an antiemetic of the phenothiazine group which is used to treat nausea and vomiting. It is marketed in Europe, Canada, and South America. As of August 2020, metopimazine has been repurposed and is additionally under development for use in the United States for the treatment of gastroparesis.

Metopimazine has antidopaminergic, antihistamine, and anticholinergic activity. However, it has also been described as a highly potent and selective dopamine D2 and D3 receptor antagonist. The D2 receptor antagonism of metopimazine is thought to underlie its antiemetic and gastroprokinetic effects. It is said to not readily cross the blood–brain barrier and hence to have peripheral selectivity, in contrast to metoclopramide but similarly to domperidone. Unlike domperidone however, metopimazine shows no hERG inhibition and hence is expected to have a more favorable cardiovascular profile. In contrast to metoclopramide, metopimazine does not interact with serotonin 5-HT3 and 5-HT4 receptors.

Synthesis
 
For the first step, 2-Methylthiophenothiazine [7643-08-5] (1) is protected by sequential reaction with sodium amide and acetic anhydride to give 1-[2-(Methylthio)-10H-phenothiazin-10-yl]ethanone [23503-69-7] (2). Oxidation with peracid proceeds preferentially on the more electron-rich alkyl thioether to give the sulfone. Upon hydrolysis of the acetate this affords 2-(methylsulfonyl)-10h-phenothiazine [23503-68-6] (3). Alkylation with 1-Bromo-3-chloropropane (4) gives 10-(3-chloropropyl)-2-methylsulfonylphenothiazine [40051-30-7] (5). Alkylation with piperidine-4-carboxamide (Isonipecotamide) [39546-32-2] (6) affords metopimazine (7).

References

External links
 Metopimazine - AdisInsight

Antiemetics
Benzosulfones
Carboxamides
D2 antagonists
D3 antagonists
H1 receptor antagonists
Motility stimulants
Muscarinic antagonists
Peripherally selective drugs
Phenothiazines
Piperidines